The 2016 National Rugby Championship (known as the Buildcorp National Rugby Championship for sponsorship reasons) was the third season of Australia's National Rugby Championship. It involved eight professional rugby union teams, one team fewer than in the previous two seasons. The competition kicked off on 27 August 2016.

Teams

A major change was made for the 2016 season with the scrapping of the Sydney Stars team. The Australian Rugby Union did not renew their licence for the competition to consolidate playing strength of the teams in New South Wales. The North Harbour Rays subsequently changed their name to become the Sydney Rays. Prior to the season it was also reported that the Canberra Vikings would be renamed the Canberra Kookaburras in a return to the traditional name of the ACT team, but this change was postponed until at least the 2017 season.

The eight teams for the 2016 NRC season include three from New South Wales, two from Queensland, and one each from Australian Capital Territory, Victoria, and Western Australia:

Home match venues scheduled for the 2016 NRC season:

Television coverage and streaming
Two of the NRC matches each weekend were broadcast live via Fox Sports, with the other matches shown on the Fox Sports streaming platform. Discussion of the NRC competition was included on Fox Sports' review show NRC Extra Time on Monday nights, and the Rugby 360 program on Wednesday evenings.

Experimental Law Variations
The most significant new law variation adopted for the 2016 season was the further change in point scoring values, with tries made worth six points and any form of goal worth two points.

Two of the scrum law variations trialed since the since the inaugural season of the National Rugby Championship in 2014 were adopted (along with other minor amendments) into World Rugby's laws in 2016 and were thus no longer law variations. These changes to Law 20.1(d) and Law 20.12(c) sanctioned against delay in forming a scrum, and against a scrum half whose team has not won the ball stepping onto the space between the position flanker and No. 8 while the ball is in the scrum.

The other law variations used in 2014 and 2015, were retained for the 2016 season.

Regular season
The eight teams compete in a round-robin tournament for the regular season. Each team has four matches at home and four away. The top four teams qualify for the title play-offs with semi-finals and finals.

During this section of the tournament, teams can also play for the Horan-Little Shield, a challenge trophy that is played for when a challenge is accepted or offered by the holders.

Standings

Competition rounds

Round 1

Round 2

Round 3

Round 4

Round 5

Round 6

Round 7

Title play-offs
The top four sides in the regular season advanced to the semifinals of the knock-out stage, which was followed by the final to decide the National Rugby Championship title.

Semi-finals

Final

Players
The leading scorers in 2016 over the regular season and finals combined were:

See also

 Australian Rugby Championship (predecessor tournament)
 Super Rugby

Notes
 The venue for the Round 5 fixture between NSW Country Eagles and Perth Spirit was moved from Orange due to heavy rains causing Endeavour Oval to become waterlogged. The match was relocated to Concord Oval in Sydney.

References

External links

NRC on Fox Sports

Team webpages

2016 National Rugby Championship
2016 in Australian rugby union
2016 rugby union tournaments for clubs